Andoy Balunbalunan (born Alejandro Villegas; 1909–1990) was a pre-World War II Filipino actor and comedian. He appeared in the bodabil circuit and other stage plays. He was married to Dely Atay-Atayan, a comedian.

After World War II, he stopped making movies. After his death, his partner continued to make movies until the 1980s. He was also a recording artist in the 1950s.

Filmography
 1940 - Lakambini - Cervantina Filipina Corp.
 1940 - Nag-iisang Sangla - LVN Pictures

References

External links
 
 Dely Atay-Atayan story

1900s births
Filipino male film actors
Year of death missing
20th-century Filipino male singers
Filipino male stage actors